Elections to Southwark Council were held in May 1982.  The whole council was up for election. Turnout was 30.5%.

Election result

|}

Ward results

Abbey

Alleyn

Pamela Cooper was a sitting councillor for Ruskin ward

Barset

Bellenden

Bricklayers

Browning

Brunswick

Burgess

Cathedral

Bert Ray was a sitting councillor for Chaucer ward, and was previously elected as a Labour councillor

Chaucer

College

Consort

Dockyard

Faraday

Friary

Liddle

Lyndhurst

Paula Moore was a sitting councillor for Rye ward

William Payne was previously elected as a Labour councillor

Newington

Catherine Clunn was previously elected as a Labour councillor

Riverside

Coral Newell was previously elected as a Labour councillor

Charles Sawyer was a sitting councillor for Rotherhithe ward, and was previously elected as a Labour councillor

Margaret White was previously elected as a Labour councillor

Rotherhithe

Ruskin

Catherine Clough was a sitting councillor for Alleyn ward

Rye

St Giles

Anthony Ritchie was a sitting councillor for Barset ward

Michael Geater was a sitting councillor for Liddle ward

The Lane

Waverley

By-Elections

The by-election was called following the resignation of Cllr. James Patrick

The by-election was called following the resignation of Cllr. Robert Smyth

The by-election was called following the resignation of Cllr. Ronald Slater

The by-election was called following the resignation of Cllr. John Meakin

The by-election was called following the resignation of Cllr. Paula Moore

The by-election was called following the resignation of Cllr. Harold Young

The by-election was called following the resignation of Cllr. Barbara Burgess

The by-election was called following the resignation of Cllr. John Fowler

References

Council elections in the London Borough of Southwark
1982 London Borough council elections
May 1982 events in the United Kingdom
20th century in the London Borough of Southwark